Masjid-i-Ala (also called Jama Masjid) is a mosque located inside the Srirangapatna Fort in Srirangapatna in Mandya District in Karnataka. It was built in 1786-87, during the regime of Tipu Sultan.

History
Srirangapatna fort is believed to have been built by Timmanna Nayaka, a ruler of Vijayanagar Empire in 1454 CE. The fort was taken up by Wodeyars in 1495, Nawab of Arcot, Peshwas and the Marathas subsequently. During the rule of Krishnaraja Wodeyar (1734–66), the kingdom became a strong military force and came under the control of the military general Hyder Ali, the father of Tipu Sultan.  During 1782, Tipu Sultan, the son of Hyder Ali took the reign of the fort and built fortifications. Tipu was invaded many times by the British forces.

Tipu Sultan built the mosque during 1786-87 close to his palace. The mosque has three inscriptions that mentions the nine names of the Islamic prophet Muhammad. The inscriptions also mention the way Tipu Sultan as the builder of the mosque. In modern times, the mosque is maintained and administered by the Bangalore Circle of Archaeological Survey of India. The mosque has a Madrasa and a cloister for rooms.

Hindu right wing groups have made claims that the mosque was built over a hanuman temple. Inscriptions on the mosque written in Persian, however state that Tipu as the builder of the Mosque.

Architecture
The mosque is located close to the Bangalore Gate and has two minarets. The mosque is built over an elevated platform. The mosque has three inscriptions that mentions the nine names of Muhammad. 

The mosque has two tall minarets which are separated by three octagonal stages. There are galleried balconies that separate each stage of the minaret. There are turnip-shaped domes on the top of the minarets. There is a large rectangular prayer hall inside the mosque with a flat roof supported by foiled arches.  There is a series of arched openings in the minarets as well as the walls of the rectangular terrace. The mosque has two stories and unlike other mosques, it does not have a dome. There is an old clock installed during the early 20th century. A Madrasa is operated from the mosque, where learning of Islam is imparted. In modern times, the mosque is maintained and administered by the Bangalore Circle of Archaeological Survey of India. The mosque has a Madrasa and a cloister for rooms.

Wars
After several unsuccessful attempts, British forces under the command of Colonel Wellesly, made an attack on 4 May 1799 under the covers. The forces had 2,494 British officers and 1 lakh Maratha cavalry and Nizams soldiers totaling to a  force of more than 2 and half lakh which attached less than 20 thousand soldiers in the fort who defended bravely, had it not been to Mir Sadaq they would have repelled the invaders successfully. The minister mixed dung and water in the gun powder  Tipu was killed in the battle and the English had a treaty with the Wodeyar queen.

Controversy

There were demands from Hindu groups, that Puja, or Hindu Worship of Hamuman or Anjenya be permitted at Jamia Masjid, as it was claimed the structure was originally a temple, and that Tipu Sultan had forcibly removed the Hindu deities and converted it into a mosque. The evidence pointed out is the report in the 1935, Annual Report of the Mysore Archeological Department, published by the Mysore Government. Further, the motifs on the granite pillars had Hindu deities and Hindu iconography, and emblem of the Hoysala empire was also present. According to the 1935 report, a Muslim fakir had made a young Tippu promise him that the Temple would be converted into a mosque after he had taken power over Mysore, and on assuming power Tippu had made good his promise.

Notes

References

External links 

Mosques in Karnataka
Religious buildings and structures completed in 1787
1787 establishments in India
Buildings and structures in Mandya district
Srirangapatna